A Little Pretty Pocket-Book, intended for the Amusement of Little Master Tommy and Pretty Miss Polly with Two Letters from Jack the Giant Killer is the title of a 1744 children's book by British publisher John Newbery.

History
It is generally considered the first children's book, and consists of simple rhymes for each of the letters of the alphabet. To market the book to the children of the day, the book came with either a ball for a boy, or a pincushion for a girl. The book was very popular in England, and earned Newbery much fame; eventually the Newbery Medal was named after him. The book was re-published in Colonial America in 1762. Dr A S W Rosenbach called this book, "One of the most influential and important books in the history of juvenile literature."

Description 
The book includes a woodcut of stool-ball among other period games, and includes a rhyme entitled "Base-Ball."  This is the first known reference to "base-ball" or "baseball" in print, though it actually meant the game rounders, an ancestor of modern baseball. Of baseball's English origin: "The game of Rounders has been played in England since Tudor Times, with the earliest reference being in 1744 in 'A Little Pretty Pocketbook' where it is called baseball."  "It is a striking and fielding team game, which involves hitting a small hard leather cased ball with a round wooden or metal bat and then running around 4 bases in order to score."

References

External links

 A Pretty Little Pocket Book From the Collections at the Library of Congress
 Article from History.org

1744 books
18th-century British children's literature
Children's poetry books
Alphabet books
History of baseball
British children's books